The Triunfo Pass is a mountain pass in the Santa Monica Mountains, located on Yerba Buena Road in southeastern Ventura County, Southern California.

Automobile access to Circle X Ranch Park, part of the Santa Monica Mountains National Recreation Area, is on the 
west side of the pass.

The pass is the site of an earth station.

See also

References

External links

Mountain passes of California
Santa Monica Mountains
Landforms of Ventura County, California
Roads in Ventura County, California